The 1990 Rutgers Scarlet Knights football team represented Rutgers University in the 1990 NCAA Division I-A football season. In their first season under head coach Doug Graber, the Scarlet Knights compiled a 3–8 record while competing as an independent and were outscored by their opponents 302 to 173. The team won games against Kentucky (24-8), Colgate (28-17), and Akron (20-17). The team's statistical leaders included Tom Tarver with 1,348 passing yards, Tekay Dorsey with 505 rushing yards, and James Guarantino with 386 receiving yards.

Schedule

Personnel

References

Rutgers
Rutgers Scarlet Knights football seasons
Rutgers Scarlet Knights football